Deep Dark Blue Centre is the debut album by composer and bassist Graham Collier recorded in 1967 and originally released on the British Deram label.

Reception

Allmusic said "Collier's wonderfully diverse compositions are waiting to be discovered by a new generation, as his timeless, carefully crafted structures are charmingly alluring. Although this is not in any sense earth-shattering, or even groundbreaking, it is albums such as this one upon which Collier's reputation stands, and this satisfying release is a wonderful addition to his oeuvre". On All About Jazz Nic Jones noted "the quasi-impressionistic tones of Deep Dark Blue Centre echo the work of Gil Evans, albeit with a more rhythmically animated sense. Collier's composerly aims are aided in no small part by his sidemen, with Karl Jenkins's oboe topping things off in some of the ensembles and Dave Aaron's dry alto sax and the always deeply worthwhile trumpet of Harry Beckett outstanding in the solo stakes".

Track listing
All compositions by Graham Collier.
 "Blue Walls" - 4:32
 "El Miklos" - 3:15
 "Hirayoshi Suite" - 5:55
 "Crumblin' Cookie" - 5:21
 "Conversations" - 6:42
 "Deep Dark Blue Centre" - 13:23

Personnel
Graham Collier - bass
Harry Beckett (tracks 1, 3 & 4), Kenny Wheeler (tracks 2, 5 & 6) - trumpet, flugelhorn
Michael Gibbs - trombone
Dave Aaron - alto saxophone, flute
Karl Jenkins - baritone saxophone, oboe
Philip Lee - guitar
John Marshall - drums

References

1967 debut albums
Graham Collier albums
Deram Records albums